Rococo Variations is the last ballet made by Christopher Wheeldon during his tenure as New York City Ballet's first resident choreographer; it was made to Tschaikovsky's Variations on a Rococo Theme for violoncello and orchestra in A major Op. 33 (1876–77). The premiere took place on Thursday, 7 February 2008 at the New York State Theater, Lincoln Center, with costumes by Holly Hynes.

Original cast
Sterling Hyltin
Sara Mearns
Giovanni Villalobos  
Adrian Danchig-Waring

References 

 

Repertory Week, NYCB, Spring season, 2008 repertory, week 5

Playbill, New York City Ballet, Thursday, 29 May 2008

Reviews 

 
NY Times by Alastair Macaulay, 9 February 2008

Village Voice by Deborah Jowitt, 5 February 2008

Ballets by Christopher Wheeldon
Ballets to the music of Pyotr Ilyich Tchaikovsky
2008 ballet premieres
New York City Ballet repertory
Ballets designed by Holly Hynes